Alexander Shapovalov (born 28 January 1989, in Smolensk), better known by his stage name Shapov, is a Russian record producer and DJ. He is also a former member of the electronic project Hard Rock Sofa, and in his solo career has most notably collaborated with Axwell and Armin van Buuren.

Biography

Hard Rock Sofa 
Alexander was interested in music from a young age and began experimenting with production when he was 16 years old. In 2005, he and another DJ and producer Denis Chepikov joined together to form the music project Hard Rock Sofa.

Shapov 
In 2015, Alexander left Hard Rock Sofa and began his solo career under the stage name Shapov. In the same year he joined the British label Axtone Records, which was founded by Swedish House Mafia member Axwell. 

On 23 February 2015, Shapov released an extended play on Axtone titled “Shapov EP”. On 5 October 2015, he released a second EP titled “Everybody”, with both songs on the EP being collaborations with duo Meg & Nerak.

A month later, Shapov released the track “Our World” featuring American singer and songwriter Justin Tranter. This composition was included in the anniversary album “Axtone Ten", which celebrated a decade since Axtone's formation. At the end of 2015, he was named as a “Breakthrough Artist of the Year" in the EDM category by Beatport. Early in 2016, Shapov released the song “Future Rave”, which he debuted in a guest mix he recorded for the Diplo & Friends show on BBC Radio 1. 

In 2017, Shapov released a third EP titled "Four Corners", consisting of four tracks across both Axtone and Armada Music. Among the songs released on this EP were “Breathing Deeper”, which was another collaboration with duo Meg & Nerak, and “Some People”, which was written with Russian electronic group Beverly Pills. The next project in his career was the release of “The Way" together with the trio Trouze.

In 2018 Shapov collaborated with Dutch trance DJ Armin van Buuren to release “The Last Dancer", accompanied by van Buuren inviting Shapov up to play their track together during van Buuren's mainstage set at Ultra Music Festival in Miami. Shortly afterwards, the pair released a new collaboration called “Our Origin”, which van Buuren played to open his set at Tomorrowland that year. “Our Origin” was also used in the Tomorrowland 2018 festival aftermovie.

Near the end of 2019, a collaboration with Magnificence titled "Unboring the Future" released and was subsequently used in the promotional presentation video for the new generation of the Peugeot 208. In 2020, Shapov continued to experiment across genres such as psy-trance, leading to a collaboration with Vini Vici and Nervo for a song titled 'My World'. 

Tracks by Shapov under both his time in Hard Rock Sofa and his solo ventures have been featured in Hollywood movies and TV shows, such as Fast & Furious 6, The Lego Batman Movie, and Netflix series such as Quicksand, Werewolf, and The Last Days of American Crime.

Discography

Extended plays

Singles and collaborations

Remixes

References

External links
 
 Shapov VK

1989 births
Living people
Russian record producers
Russian DJs
Electronic dance music DJs